Nelly Sindayen (April 7, 1949 – April 4, 2009) was a Filipino journalist. She was best known for her longtime association with Time magazine as a correspondent based in Manila.

Life
Nelly Sindayen was born in Siasi, Sulu to a Christian father and a Muslim mother She earned a journalism degree at the University of Santo Tomas and worked for the Manila Bulletin and various news agencies before joining Time magazine in the mid-1970s. Sindayen would remain at Time until 2007, when illness disabled her from returning to work.

While at Time, Sindayen scored a notable scoop in 1983 concerning the supposed kidnapping of Tommy Manotoc, future son-in-law of President Ferdinand Marcos. Sindayen reported for Time that Manotoc had in fact gone to the Dominican Republic to obtain a quick divorce, then headed to the United States to secretly marry Marcos's eldest daughter, Imee. Sindayen also reported on the controversies that hounded President Joseph Estrada, and narrated an eye-witness account on an aborted coup plot against President Gloria Macapagal Arroyo in February 2006.

Death
Nelly Sindayen suffered a severe diabetic stroke in June 2007 and died from lingering complications on April 4, 2009, three days before her 60th birthday.

References

Deaths from diabetes
Filipino journalists
People from Sulu
University of Santo Tomas alumni
Time (magazine) people
1949 births
2009 deaths
Filipino Muslims
20th-century journalists